François Brient (1 June 1901 – 14 November 1979) was a French racing cyclist. He rode in the 1924 Tour de France.

References

1901 births
1979 deaths
French male cyclists
Place of birth missing